Dans Jansons (born 21 May 1966) is a Latvian freestyle skier. He competed in the men's moguls event at the 1992 Winter Olympics.

References

External links
 

1966 births
Living people
Latvian male freestyle skiers
Olympic freestyle skiers of Latvia
Freestyle skiers at the 1992 Winter Olympics
Sportspeople from Jelgava
20th-century Latvian people